Universal Engineering College is a private engineering college situated in Irinjalakuda, Thrissur District of Kerala, India. The college is affiliated to All India Council for Technical Education (AICTE) New Delhi, and the APJ Abdul Kalam Technological University.

References

Engineering colleges in Thrissur district
All India Council for Technical Education
Colleges affiliated with the University of Calicut